The Southwestern College Moundbuilders program is a college football team that represents Southwestern College in the Kansas Collegiate Athletic Conference, a part of the NAIA.  The team has had 28 head coaches since its first recorded football game in 1895. The current coach is Brad Griffin, who was announced on January 21, 2015 as the new head coach.  Griffin replaces Ken Crandall who resigned at the conclusion of the 2014 season.

Key

Coaches

Details
The following are details on coaches that do not have articles on Wikipedia.  For coaches with articles on Wikipedia, see links in the table above.

John Jacob Thiel
Although Southwestern competed in football as far back as 1895, John Jacob Thiel was the first official head football coach at Southwestern, and he held that position for two seasons, from 1903 until 1904.  His coaching record at Southwestern was 9–5–1.

After his work at the collegiate level as a professor and coach, he moved to Ritzville, Washington near his family and took up farming.  He died in Spokane at the age of 69.

Frank Armin 
Frank Armin was the fourth coach for the Moundbuilders and held that position for the 1908 season. Armin was also the basketball coach at Southwestern for the 1908–1909 season.  He was the first basketball coach on record for the school, and the team produced six wins and three losses.

Fred Dittman 
The 12th head coach was Fred Dittman, who also served in World War II with General Patton’s Army and rose to the rank of captain.  In 1946, Dittmann was assistant football coach to Art Kahler at Southwestern and then served as head football coach for the 1948 season while he pursued a master’s degree in chemistry from the University of Kansas.

Robert Hower
Hower was the 15th coach for Southwestern and held the position from 1954 to 1958.

Hower also coached men's basketball at Southwestern and was the 13th person on record to hold that post.  He coached for thirteen seasons, from 1955 until 1967 and then again for the 1970–71 season. His record was 32–37 and the team secured two Kansas Collegiate Athletic Conference championships, in 1961 and again in 1963.

Hower served as the athletic director at Southwestern until his sudden death from complications from an automobile accident in 1972. His son, Phil Hower, coached the Moundbuilders from 1977 until the conclusion of the 1980 season.

Phil Hower
Hower was the 21st football coach for program and he held that position four seasons, from 1977 to 1980.  He was mentor to future Minnesota coach Jerry Kill and son of former Moundbulder athletic director and coach Robert Hower.

Hower's love and passion to play the game of football continued after he graduated and was coaching high school football.  He remained active and an avid supporter of the program, playing in an alumni game and receiving a shoulder injury.

Hower continually worked in coaching, including working as the linebackers coach at Friends University in Wichita, Kansas under head coach Monty Lewis.  Hower died in Winfield on April 19, 2014 at the age of 72.

See also

 List of people from Cowley County, Kansas

Notes

References

Lists of college football head coaches

Kansas sports-related lists